Olufolasade "Sade" Ayomide Danielle Adamolekun (born 21 February 2001) is an American-born Jamaican footballer who plays as a forward or a midfielder for USC Trojans and the Jamaica women's national team.

Early life
Born in Austin, Texas to a Yoruba Nigerian father Lanre Adamolekun and Jamaican mother Michelle Adamolekun, Olufolasade was raised with her older brother Nathaniel.

In 2016, Adamolekun was the recipient of the UIL Girls Soccer All District 14-6A Award as a freshman at Lake Travis High School in Austin, Texas. As a sophomore at Fleming Island High School she earned the All-First Coast 1st Team Award in 2017 after scoring 22 goals. In 2017 and 2018, Adamolekun was the recipient of the United Soccer Coaches Youth Girls All-South Region Award. She was also recognized and named to the US Development Academy's U16/U17 East Conference Best XI in the inaugural season of the Girls program in 2018.

Youth National Teams
United States of America

In March 2014, at  the age of 13, Adamolekun attended the United States ID2 National Training camp in Portland, OR. The camp was used as an evaluation for future US national team training camps. Adamolekun was then called into the U-14 US National Team in June, August and October 2014. In April 2014, she attended the U-15 US National Team camps held at the US Soccer National Training Center in Carson, California.  At the age of 14, Adamolekun attended the U-17 US Women's National Team camp from June 15, – 22, 2014 at the U.S. Olympic Training Center in Chula Vista, California. In March, September and November 2015, Adamolekun attended the U15 US. National Team camps.  Adamolekun was later called into the U-18 U.S. Women's National Team camp in Bradenton, Florida from October 6–13, 2018.

Jamaica

Adamolekun accepted the Jamaica U-17 call-up to participate in the 2018 CONCACAF Women's U-17 Championship qualification from October 16–22, 2017 in Port-au-Prince, Haiti. Adamolekun earned the top goal scorer accolades of the tournament, notching 4 goals in 3 games in qualification.

At the age of 16, Adamolekun was named to the Jamaica U-20 roster for the 2018 CONCACAF Women's U-20 Championship qualification in Basseterre, St. Kitts. In the first match, Adamolekun scored the lone goal to give Jamaica a 1–0 win against the Dominican Republic. Jamaica secured a berth to the 2018 CONCACAF Women's U-20 Championship on the strength of a first-place finish in the final round of the Caribbean qualifying. Adamolekun ended the qualification tournament with two goals in three matches.

Adamolekun was named to the Jamaica 2018 CONCACAF Women's U-20 Championship roster in Couva, Trinidad & Tobago. Adamolekun scored a goal in Jamaica's 2–2 tie against Nicaragua, and was credited with the well taken free kick that put Jamaica on level ground against the United States.

University of Southern California (2019 - Present)
Adamolekun accepted a soccer scholarship and started her collegiate career with the University of Southern California in August 2019.  Despite continued absences due to the Jamaica women's national football team call-ups and commitments throughout her freshman year, Adamolekun earned the PAC-12 Conference honor of being selected to the "All Freshman Team" for the 2019 collegiate season.

Club career

Santa Clara Blue Heat FC (June - July 2021)
Adamolekun was a member of the 2021 United Women's Soccer National Championship Santa Clarita Blue Heat team, contributing a goal and an assist in their 5-0 defeat of Connecticut Fusion FC.

International career

At the young age of 17, Adamolekun first appeared for the senior Jamaica women's national team on 28 October 2018, netting a brace in a 3–0 friendly win against Nottingham Forest Ladies. Note this appearance does not qualify as an international cap nor do the goals count toward her senior international goal tally since the match was played against a club and not a senior national team.

Following the historic FIFA Women's World Cup qualification by the Jamaica women's national football team, Adamolekun was named to its 2019 World Cup training camp roster in January 2019. She received her next call up for the second 2019 World Cup preparation camp in Jamaica, and made her official senior international debut as a substitute in the 1–0 friendly win against Chile on February 28, 2019. She also featured as a substitute in Jamaica's 3–2 friendly win against Chile on March 3, 2019.

Adamolekun was call-up for Jamaica's third 2019 World Cup Preparation camp held in Durban, South Africa in April 2019, where she featured as a substitute in Jamaica's 1-1 tie against South Africa South Africa on April 7, 2019.

Adamolekun was called up for Jamaica's fourth 2019 World Cup Preparation camp in Kingston, Jamaica in May 2019 and featured in the starting line-up and was credited with one assist in Jamaica's 3-1 friendly win against Panama on May 19, 2019.

At the age of 18 years old and prior to graduating High School, Adamolekun was named as one of the 23 players selected by the Jamaica women's national football team for the 2019 FIFA Women's World Cup squads.

On May 24, 2019, the Jamaica women's national football team played their final game in Miramar, Florida in the Reggae Girlz Foundation World Cup Send Off Celebration, before departing for the 2019 FIFA Women's World Cup in France.  Adamolekun scored a goal in the Jamaica's 2-1 friendly win against club side FC Surge.  Note this appearance does not qualify as an international cap nor dos the goal count toward her senior international goal tally since the match was played against a club and not a senior national team.

2019 FIFA Women's World Cup
Adamolekun was a member of the 23 player Jamaica women's national football team that made history as the first Caribbean team to participate in a FIFA 
Women's World Cup.  Adamolekun was one the youngest players on the Jamaica women's national football team and was recognized as one of the top 10 teenagers to watch  at the 2019 FIFA Women's World Cup in France.  At the age of 18, she made her debut in the 2019 FIFA Women's World Cup for the Jamaica women's national football team starting XI  against Italy in Reims, France on June 14, 2019.

2019 Pan American Games
Adamolekun was one of the 18 players selected for the 2019 Pan American Games in Lima, Peru, where she was featured in the starting XI and was credited with assist in Jamaica's 1-0 win against Peru on August 6, 2019.

2020 CONCACAF Women's Olympic Qualifying Championship 
Adamolekun was one of the 20 players selected for the 2020 CONCACAF Women's Olympic Qualifying Championship in Edinberg, Texas, where she was featured in the starting XI against Mexico and St. Kitts & Nevis and was credited with one assist  in Jamaica's 7-0 win against St. Kitts & Nevis on February 4, 2020.

Personal life
Adamolekun was born in the United States to a  Nigerian Yoruba father and a Jamaican mother. Her brother Nathaniel Adamolekun is also a footballer. She attended Lake Travis High School for her Freshman year before relocating to Florida, where she graduated from Fleming Island High School in Florida.

Other work

Leadership
Adamolekun has been a member of the Jack and Jill of America organization in Austin, Texas and Jacksonville, Florida from the age 2 – 18 years old, where she volunteered countless hours in support of educational, cultural, civic, health, recreational and social programs.

In 2020, during the social unrest across the United States, Adamolekun co-founded the United Black Student Athletes Association (UBSAA) at the University of Southern California (USC) in partnership with the USC Administration to encourage her peers to utilize their platform as student-athletes to make a positive impact and help bridge any gaps at the University of Southern California and within their communities.

References

External links

2001 births
Living people
Citizens of Jamaica through descent
Jamaican women's footballers
Women's association football forwards
Women's association football midfielders
Jamaica women's international footballers
2019 FIFA Women's World Cup players
Pan American Games competitors for Jamaica
Footballers at the 2019 Pan American Games
Jamaican people of Nigerian descent
Jamaican people of Yoruba descent
Soccer players from Austin, Texas
American women's soccer players
USC Trojans women's soccer players
African-American women's soccer players
American sportspeople of Nigerian descent
American people of Yoruba descent
American sportspeople of Jamaican descent
21st-century African-American sportspeople
21st-century African-American women